SuperStar KZ was a reality television show based on the popular British show Pop Idol, which aired from 2003 to 2007 on the Kazakh television station Perviy Kanal Evrasia. The talent contest determined the best young singers in Kazakhstan by allowing  viewers to vote by phone or SMS. A supplementary show SuperStar KZ Dnevnik (SuperStar KZ Diary), shown twice weekly, provided a recap of the previous show and week's events for the contestants.

SuperStar KZ was presented entirely in Russian, though Russian, Kazakh and English songs were performed. Some contestants  such as Ainur Nazarbekova, Altynay and Zhanara spoke Kazakh on the show.  A mix of ethnic groups, typical of the diversity in Kazakhstan, was usually represented, including Kazakhs, Russians, Koreans, Uyghurs, and Tatars.

SuperStar KZ held auditions in sixteen cities to find the best talent anywhere in Kazakhstan, visiting Astana, Taraz, Aktau, Semey, Pavlodar, Atyrau, Shymkent, Kyzylorda, Taldykorgan, Ekibastuz, Aralsk, Oskemen, Karaganda and Kokshetau, Aktobe before finishing in Almaty.

SuperStar KZ 1

Finalists
(ages stated at time of contest)

SuperStar KZ 2

Finalists
(ages stated at time of contest)

SuperStar KZ 3

SuperStar KZ Season 3 premiered on Perviy Kanal Evraziya on November 11, 2005.

Auditions
Over 12,000 people auditioned for SuperStar KZ Season 3 across nine cities:
Almaty: October 7, October 8, November 1, November 2
Aqtau: October 10, October 11
Aktobe: October 13, October 14
Pavlodar: October 15, October 16
Kostanay: October 18, October 19
Karaganda: October 20, October 21
Astana: October 22, October 23
Öskemen: October 24, October 25
Shymkent: October 27, October 28

Top 148
In November, the Top 148 successful candidates met in Almaty to perform in a three-day theatre round consisting of a chorus, duo & solo performance where eliminations would take place at each stage. During the first and last stage contestants can sing any song, during the duo stage a pre selected song was to be chosen, this included (among others) - Could I Have This Kiss Forever? by Whitney Houston & Enrique Iglesias and Махаббат Жалыны by Madina Sadvaqasova.

Top 40 - Semi Finals
Five groups of eight contestants performed every Sunday night to determine the two best singers of each group to advance to the Top 12. There was a Wildcards show or "Lucky ticket" round as it was known on the sixth week to give a last chance performance from unsuccessful contestants. Contestants sing a song of their own choice with piano and guitar backing.

Group 1 (January 7, 2006)
Adylzhan Umarov - Любить Тебя by Santos & Yuliya Nachalova
Ayan Birbayev - Айсулу by Bangor
Daniyar Otegen - I Believe I Can Fly by R. Kelly
Ekaterina Revanova (from Karaganda) - Ландыш Серебристый by 
Marzhan Makisheva - Лебединая Верность by Evgeniy Martanov
Meruert Musrali - 
Nurzhan Kermenbayev (from Satpaev) - 
Zarina Eleusizova - All At Once by Whitney Houston

Group 2 (January 14, 2006)
Aliya Abilkayirova (from Almaty) - Je T'Aime by Lara Fabian
Altynay Sapargalieva (from Zhanaözen) - The Voice Within by Christina Aguilera
Arstan Mirzagereev (from Karaganda) - Где Же Ты? by K-7
Dauren Orazbekov (from Karaganda) - Ночь Подруга by A-Studio
Gulmira Irzhanova (from Kostanai) - Underneath Your Clothes by Shakira
Gulmira Zakiryanova (from Kostanai) - Омiр-Өзен by Altinay Zhorabayeva
Sarman Tulebayev (from Karaganda) - Belle
Vyacheslav Balashov (from Ust-Kamenogorsk) - Необыкноженные Глаза by Rashid Behbudov

Group 3 (January 21, 2006)
Anastasiya Rossoshanskaya (from Karaganda) - Отпусти Меня by Valeriya
Ardak Kenzhesarin (from Pavlodar) - Алатау by 
Irina Pisareva (from Pavlodar) - Више Облаков by Slivki
Karlygash Tastambekova (from Almaty) - 
Marat Orazbayev (from Zhanaözen) - Разлука by 101
Meruert Niyazbayeva (from Kostanai) - I Have Nothing by Whitney Houston
Naylya Zaitova (from Almaty) - Beautiful by Christina Aguilera
Rinat Malzagov (from Pavlodar) - Немного Жаль by Filipp Kirkorov

Group 4 (January 28, 2006)
Dariya Akparova (from Karaganda) - I Will Survive by Gloria Gaynor
Dinara Koskeldiyeva (from Almaty) - Hero by Mariah Carey
Erlan Alimov (from Kostanai) - Ты Сделана Из Огня by Vadim Uslanov
Mnash Zhanbolatova (from Almaty) - Стена by Larisa Dolina
Timur Kalekperov (from Ust-Kamenogorsk) - Как Ты Красива Сегодня by Valery Meladze
Vladimir Kim (from Karaganda) - Вечная Любовь by Andre Makarskiy
Zarina Beysembayeva (from Karaganda) - Между Нами Зима by Dilnaz Akhmadieva
Zhanara Khamitova (from Karaganda) -

Group 5 (February 4, 2006)
Anastasiya Usova (from Aqtöbe) - Adagio by Laura Fabian
Anton Ivlev (from Kostanai) - Jamaica by Robertino Loreti
Asem Tasbulatova (from Shymkent) - Жалт Етiп Өткен by Asem
Evgeniy Gartung (from Rudniy) - Тропикана-Женщина by Valery Meladze
Irina Kononova (from Ust-Kamenogorsk) - I Feel Good (I Got You) by James Brown
Marat Nigmatov (from Astana) - Серенада 2000 by Bravo
Timur Akhmetzhanov (from Aqtöbe) - Insatiable by Darren Hayes
Vera Kan (from Almaty) - Герой Не Мойего Романа by Yuliya Nachalova

Wildcards (February 18, 2006)
Anastasiya Usova - Бакыт Кушагында by Shamshi Kaldayakov
Ayan Birbayev - As Long As You Love Me by Backstreet Boys
Daniyar Otegen - 
Dariya Akparova - 
Erlan Alimov - Сердце, Скажи by Ivan Breusov
Gulmira Irzhanova - Don't Speak by No Doubt
Marat Orazbayev - Я-Ето Ты by Murat Nasyrov
Marzhan Makisheva - Karma by Alicia Keys
Mnash Zhanbolatova - 
Naylya Zaitova - 
Sarman Tulebayev - Голос by Aleksandr Panayotov
Vera Kan - Иногда by

Top 12/Themes
Each week there was a common theme on which the contestants base their song choices:
Top 12: Contestant's Choice (including special guest jury member Tomas N'evergreen)
Top 11: Russian Hits
Top 10: Hits From Soviet Era Films
Top 9: Latino Hits
Top 8: Kazakh Hits 
Top 7: Eastern Hits 
Top 6: My Idol
Top 5: 70's & 80's Hits 
Top 4: Hits Of The New Millennium 
Top 3: Love Songs
Top 2: Grand Final

Jury/Hosts
The jury members for the third season were:
Nagima Eskalieva - Recording artist. 
Ludmila Kim - VJ. 
Kayrat Kulbayev - Vice president of local media firm Shahar Media Group & HiT TV. 
Igor Sirtsov - TV producer of local channel KTK.

and hosts for the third season were:
Alan Cherkasov
Sabina Sayakova

Hosts
The show has had many hosts throughout the three seasons including:
Nuray Mukades (Season 1 Auditions)
Irina Kordyukova (Season 1 Liveshows & Season 4)
Serik Akishev (Season 1 Liveshows)
Erik Solo (Season 2)
Ulpan Kuraisova (Season 1 Auditions & Season 2)
Sabina Sayakova (Season 3)
Alan Cherkasov (Season 3)
Adil Liyan (Season 4)

SuperStar KZ Jury

Season one
 Batyrkhan Shukenov - Famous singer and musician.
 Roman Rayfeld -  Famous music critic.
 Arman Murzagaliev - World famous violinist.
 Lyayla Sultan-Kyzy - Famous radio and TV personality.

Season two
 Dariga Nazarbayeva - Daughter of Kazakh president, Nursultan Nazarbayev.
 Almaz Amirseitov - Director of Premier Records KZ.
 Oleg Markov - TV producer.
 Diana Snegina - DJ from radio station "Europa Plus Kazakhstan"

Season three
 Nagima Eskalieva - Recording artist.
 Ludmila Kim - VJ.
 Kayrat Kulbayev - Vice president of local media firm Shahar Media Group & HiT TV.
 Igor Sirtsov - TV producer of local channel KTK.

Season four

 Nagima Eskalieva - Recording artist.
 Taras Boichenko - 
 Serik Akishev -

Bottom three statistics

Season two

On November 11 Oleg did not originally made the finals but replaced another contestant who withdrew as he got the 3rd most votes

Season three

Season four
Themes:
April 28: Russian Songs
May 5: World War 2 Era
May 12: Kazakh Songs
May 19: Drinking Songs
May 26: D'Artagnan and Three Musketeers Soundtrack
June 2: Songs for Children
June 9: World Hits
June 16: Song of Pepsi
June 23: Classic & Russian Rock
June 30: Grand Finale

On May 26 Talgat was voted off but saved by the judges

See also 
X Factor (Kazakhstan)

External links
SuperStar KZ - Unofficial Website
 - Production studio SuperStar KZ 1 & 4.
 - Unofficial Superstar KZ photo group
 — The winner of the fourth season

 
Kazakhstani music
Kazakhstani television shows
Television series by Fremantle (company)
2003 Kazakhstani television series debuts
2007 Kazakhstani television series endings
Non-British television series based on British television series
Channel One Eurasia original programming